Kasper Aalund Junker (born 5 March 1994) is a Danish professional footballer who plays for Japanese club Nagoya Grampus, on loan from Urawa Red Diamonds as a forward.

Career

Early years
Junker started playing football as a four-year-old with local club Vinding SF before moving to the Vejle Boldklub academy and from there on to Kolding IF. He joined Hessel Gods Fodboldkostskole (Hessel Gods Football Academy) in tenth grade, where he was coached by the likes of Flemming Povlsen and played for FC Djursland's team in the Denmark Series. Junker was spotted by scouts of Randers, whom he joined at U19 level in the summer of 2012, while attending HHX ("Higher Commercial Examination Programme") at Tradium Randers.

Randers
Junker made his Danish Superliga debut for Randers as a substitute in the away match against Vestsjælland on 7 March 2014, and contributed with an assist to Kasper Fisker's goal in the 1–1 draw. Junker also came on the pitch on 4 April when Randers beat AGF 1–0 in Aarhus.

In the summer of 2014, he signed a full-time contract with Randers, and was thus promoted to the first team and became a professional. In January 2015, he was sent on a six-month loan to second-tier Danish 1st Division club Fredericia, but failed to make an appearance.

AGF
In the summer of 2016, Junker signed a three-year contract with Randers' Superliga rivals to the south, AGF, where he began the season as a starter due to Morten "Duncan" Rasmussen's injury in a pre-season match.

Horsens
On the last day of the transfer window, 31 August 2018, Junker signed with AC Horsens on a five-year contract for an undisclosed fee. However, the Horsens stated that it was a record transfer fee for the club.

Norway
On 9 August 2019, Junker was loaned out to Norwegian club Stabæk from Horsens for the rest of 2019 with an option to buy. On 17 December 2019, he signed a three-year contract with Norwegian club Bodø/Glimt from 1 January 2020.

Japan
In April 2021 he was sold to Japanese club Urawa Red Diamonds.

Career statistics

Club

Honours	
Bodø/Glimt	
Eliteserien:  2020
 	
Individual
Eliteserien top scorer: 2020
J.League MVP of the month: May 2021

References

External links
 

Living people
1994 births
Association football forwards
Danish men's footballers
Denmark under-21 international footballers
Denmark youth international footballers
Danish expatriate men's footballers
FC Djursland players
Randers FC players
FC Fredericia players
Aarhus Gymnastikforening players
AC Horsens players
Stabæk Fotball players
FK Bodø/Glimt players
Denmark Series players
Danish Superliga players
Eliteserien players
Danish expatriate sportspeople in Norway
Expatriate footballers in Norway
Vejle Boldklub players
Kolding IF players
Urawa Red Diamonds players
Danish expatriate sportspeople in Japan
Expatriate footballers in Japan
J1 League players
People from Vejle Municipality
Sportspeople from the Region of Southern Denmark